German-American Day is a holiday in the United States, observed annually on October 6 under . It celebrates German-American heritage and commemorates the founding of Germantown, Pennsylvania (now part of Philadelphia) in 1683.

History
The founding of Germantown on October 6, 1683, was to provide the date for German-American Day, though "a number of" the first thirteen Quaker and Mennonite families in Germantown came from the Netherlands; until 1710, according to linguist Nicoline van der Sijs, "Germantown remained predominantly Dutch". The town was nevertheless named Germantown, as the direct vicinity of the settlement was inhabited by fifty-four German families who had accompanied Johan Printz to the Swedish settlement on the Delaware several years earlier and had resettled themselves. These families subsequently founded Germantown, Pennsylvania, which, due to greater numbers, would subsequently be dominated by Germans within a generation, thanks in part to the efforts of Caspar Wistar. In 1688, the inhabitants organized the first petition in the English colonies to abolish slavery. Originally known under the rubric of "German Day", the holiday was celebrated for the first time in Philadelphia in 1883, on the occasion of the 200th anniversary of the founding; similar celebrations developed later in other parts of the country. The custom died out during World War I as a result of the war, but the holiday was revived in 1983 in joint resolution 108. Senator Richard G. Lugar (R–Indiana) introduced the bill on April 8, 1987.

Observances
In 1983, President Ronald Reagan proclaimed October 6 as German-American Day to celebrate and honor the 300th anniversary of German immigration to and culture in the United States. On August 6, 1987, Congress approved S.J. Resolution 108, designating October 6, 1987, as German-American Day. It became  when President Reagan signed it on August 18. A proclamation (#5719) to this effect was issued on October 2, 1987, by President Reagan in a formal ceremony in the White House Rose Garden, at which time the President called on Americans to observe the day with appropriate ceremonies and activities.

Presidents since then have continued to make proclamations to observe German-American Day.

See also
 Von Steuben Day and Steuben Parade
 Oktoberfest celebrations
 German-American Heritage Foundation of the USA

References

Citations

Sources

External links
German-American Heritage Foundation of the USA in Washington, DC
German-American National Congress
Motion picture film of ceremonies held in Hindenburg Park in Los Angeles, California, on German Day, 1936, from the Hoover Institution Archives.

German-American culture
German-American history
Public holidays in the United States
Recurring events established in 1986
October observances
Germantown, Philadelphia